The Rock 'n' Roll Nashville Marathon, previously known as the Country Music Marathon (2000–2015), is an annual marathon, half marathon, and 5K run that has been held in Nashville, Tennessee, since 2000.  The marathon is followed by an evening country music concert. Nashville is a major center for the music industry, especially country music, and is commonly known as "Music City" 

The Rock 'n' Roll Marathon is a qualifying event for the Boston Marathon.  It is owned by Advance Publications as part of the Rock 'n' Roll Marathon Series.

History 

The marathon was first held in April 2000 when 3,230 men and 2,589 women completed the event.

As the event grew in popularity, a half-marathon was added in 2002. This was soon followed by the addition of a kids marathon. A 5k run was added to the race options as well as wheelchair versions of the marathon, half-marathon, and 5k races. The number of participants in the 2008 event exceeded 30,000 total entrants.

The 2020 race was postponed to November 21 and later cancelled due to the coronavirus pandemic. The 2021 edition was postponed from the traditional spring date and was held on November 20. It featured a new winner after seven-time defending winner Scott Wietecha chose not to compete.

Course 

The route begins on Broadway and continues along many of Nashville's sights, including Bridgestone Arena, the Nashville Symphony, the Frist Center for the Visual Arts, Union Station, Music Row, Vanderbilt University, Belmont University, the Belmont Mansion, the Tennessee State Capitol, the Bicentennial Capitol Mall State Park, First Horizon Park, the Cumberland River, and Shelby Park, before ending outside Nissan Stadium.

Band stages featuring live musical entertainment are located along the course. Many bands and high school cheerleaders entertain runners and walkers, and friends, families, and neighbors join in cheering on participants.

Winners 

Key: Course record (in bold)

Notes

References 

List of winners

External links 

Marathons in the United States
Half marathons in the United States
Sports competitions in Nashville, Tennessee
Sports competitions in Tennessee
Recurring sporting events established in 2000
2000 establishments in Tennessee
Dalian Wanda Group